Corixa was a biotechnology/pharmaceutical company based in Seattle, Washington involved in the development of immunotherapeutics to combat autoimmune diseases, infectious diseases, and cancer. It was founded in 1994. It operated a laboratory and production facility in Hamilton, Montana.

The name Corixa comes from the true bug (Insecta: Hemiptera: Heteroptera) genus Corixa (family Corixidae, Water boatman), described by Geoffroy, in 1762.

On 12 July 2005, the European pharmaceuticals giant GlaxoSmithKline completed the acquisition of Corixa. GSK had formerly made use of the Corixa's MPL (Monophosphoryl lipid A, a derivative of the lipid A molecule), an adjuvant in some of their vaccines.

On 31 March 2006, Corixa's doors closed after over 11 years in business.

External links

References

Biotechnology companies of the United States
Defunct companies based in Seattle
Pharmaceutical companies established in 1994
Biotechnology companies established in 1994
Biotechnology companies disestablished in 2006
1994 establishments in Washington (state)
2005 mergers and acquisitions
2006 disestablishments in Washington (state)
Pharmaceutical companies disestablished in 2006
GSK plc